Hajji Ameer Lali امیر لالی was elected to represent Kandahar Province in Afghanistan's Wolesi Jirga, the lower house of its National Legislature, in 2005. A report on Kandahar prepared at the Navy Postgraduate School stated he was a member of the Pashtun ethnic group, from the same Popolzai tribe as President Hamid Karzai. They stated he was a "demobilized local commander". He sits on the Armed Services Committee.

References

Politicians of Kandahar Province
Living people
Members of the House of the People (Afghanistan)
Year of birth missing (living people)